Lava Beds is a former settlement in Butte County, California. It lay at an elevation of 151 feet (46 m). It remained on maps as late as 1895.

References

External links

Former settlements in Butte County, California
Former populated places in California